Louis Aloysius, Prince of Hohenlohe-Waldenburg-Bartenstein (18 August 1765 – 30 May 1829) was a German prince and Marshal of France. He commanded a division of Austrian soldiers in the 1809 and 1814 campaigns during the Napoleonic Wars.

Biography 
Hohenlohe was born at Bartenstein in Hohenlohe-Bartenstein.

In 1784 he entered the service of the Palatinate, which he quit in 1792 to take command as a colonel of a French army regiment raised by his father for the service of the émigré princes of France. He greatly distinguished himself under Condé in the campaigns of 1792–93, especially at the storming of the lines of Wissembourg.

Subsequently he entered the service of the Netherlands, and, when almost surrounded by the army of General Pichegru, conducted a masterly retreat from the island of Bommelerwaard to the Waal. After the Dutch surrendered to the French armies, Hohenlohe joined the Austrian army with whom he fought in the campaigns of 1794 to 1798. The following year he was named major-general by the Archduke Charles of Austria. Hohenlohe was promoted to the rank of Feldmarschallleutnant in 1806 and the next year saw him being appointed governor of Galicia. Napoleon offered to restore to Hohenlohe his principality of Hohenlohe-Bartenstein on condition that he adhered to the Confederation of the Rhine, but as he refused, it was united to Württemberg. 

During the War of the Fifth Coalition Prince Hohenlohe led an Austrian infantry division in the IV Corps under Franz Seraph of Orsini-Rosenberg at the Battle of Eckmühl on 22 April 1809. His division consisted of three battalions each of the Infantry Regiments Josef Mittrowsky Nr. 40, Bellegarde Nr. 44 and Chasteler Nr. 46, the 5th and 6th Battalions of the Archduke Karl Legion and 14 artillery pieces. At the Battle of Aspern-Essling on 21–22 May, he led Infantry Regiments Hiller Nr. 2, Czartorisky Nr. 9, Sztaray Nr. 33 and Reuss-Greitz Nr. 55. His division numbered 9,261 infantry and 16 6-pound cannons, The IV Corps was involved in the murderous struggle for the village of Essling. At the Battle of Wagram on 5–6 July he led the Hiller and Sztaray Regiments, a total of 4,479 men. He commanded a division in Ignaz Gyulai's III Austrian Corps during the 1814 Campaign in France. He led his troops during the First Battle of Bar-sur-Aube

Hohenlohe entered French service with the rank of lieutenant general, after the fall of Napoleon and the restoration of the House of Bourbon in 1814. The following year he held the command of a regiment raised by himself, with which he took part in the Spanish campaign of 1823. The same year he was naturalized a French citizen, upon which he was made a Peer of France. In 1827 was given the distinction of Marshal of France. He died at Lunéville in 1829.

Notes

References

Attribution

1765 births
1829 deaths
German princes
Members of the Chamber of Peers of the Bourbon Restoration
Marshals of France
Military history of France
Austrian Empire commanders of the Napoleonic Wars
Generals of the Holy Roman Empire